The  Embassy of the Islamic Republic of Afghanistan in New Delhi is the diplomatic mission of the Islamic Republic of Afghanistan to India. The chancery is located at 5/50-F Shantipath in Chanakyapuri of New Delhi. In addition to the embassy, Afghanistan also has a consulate general in Mumbai and Hyderabad.

Ambassadors

Kingdom of Afghanistan (1926–1973)

 1954 to 1958 ; Sardar Najibullah, Sardar Najibullah Khan, Special Representative of His Majesty the King of Afghanistan in Pakistan, presenting his credentials on 3 December 1947
 6 April 1954 (or 1958 ?); Sardar-i-Ala Abdul Husain Aziz
 14 March 1957 (Or 1958? ) to ? (12 y ?); Sardar-i-Ala General Mohammad Omar 16 February 1965 to 14 January 1966		
 5 December 1964 (Or 16 March 1965) to 14 January 1966 (2 y); Mohammed Kabir Ludin (born 1907; died 14 January 1966 in New Delhi) was 1954 ambassador to the UN-Headquarter in New York City and Washington, D. C. presented credentials on 5 December 1957 in London and 16 February 1965 in New Delhi. Prior to his ambassadorial functions, Ludin was Minister of Public works.
 1966 to ? (3 y); Attaullah Nasser Zia
 1968   to ?; Dr. Anas
 ? to ? (3 y) H.E. Mr. Abdul Samad			
 19 September 1970 to ? (4 y); Abdul Hakim Tabibi designated on 29 July 1980 he was ambassador to the UN in New York City.

Republic of Afghanistan (1973–1978)

 16 November 1973 to ? (3 y?); Abdul Rahman Pazhwak
 1973 to ? (1 y); Dr. Abdul Zahir, Members of an Afghan Parliamentary delegation led by Dr. Abdul Zahir, President of the Afghan National Assembly, with the Prime Minister, Shri Jawaharlal Nehru, when they called on him in New Delhi on 16 December Shri
 1976; Hamidullah Enayat Seraj; 1974: Ambassador to the Court of St. James's

Democratic Republic of Afghanistan (1978–1992)

 1 September 1978 to ? (1.5 y ?); Pacha Gul Wafadar, he presented his Letter of Credence to the President, Mr N. Sanjiva Reddy, in New Delhi, on 1 September.
 Before 1981 to ???? (7 y); Dr. Mohammad Hasan Sharq			
 12 November 1986 to August 1989 (? years); Abdul Samad Azhar	
 11 October 1989 to ? (4 years); Wazir Ahmad Faizi
 Before April 1991 to 17 April 1992; Ahmad Sarwar

Islamic State of Afghanistan (1992–2002)

 ? to ? (3 years); Eshan Jaan Arif
 29 February 1996 to 27 November 2005; Masood Khalili

Islamic Republic of Afghanistan (2004–2021)

 13 November 2006  to 15 January 2010; Sayed Makhdoom Raheen
 30 June 2010  to 28 May 2012; Dr. Nanguyalai Tarzi
 13 July 2012 to 19 September 2018; Shaida Mohammad Abdali

 18 March 2021 to present Farid Mamundzay

See also 
 Afghanistan–India relations
 Diplomatic missions in India

References

External links 
  Embassy of Afghanistan in New Delhi

Diplomatic missions in India
Afghanistan
New Delhi
Afghanistan–India relations